Div or DIV may refer to:

Science and technology
 Division (mathematics), the mathematical operation that is the inverse of multiplication
 Span and div, HTML tags that implement generic elements
 div, a C mathematical function
 Divergence, a mathematical operation in vector calculus
 Digital Intrinsic Value, a digital value given to users for their data
 Days in vitro, for example see Cultured neuronal network
 Desquamative inflammatory vaginitis, an uncommon acute inflammation of the vagina; see Vulva disease

Other uses
 Diversity Immigrant Visa, a United States congressionally mandated lottery program for receiving a United States Permanent Resident Card
 504 (number) (DIV), in Roman numerals
 Div (Middle Eastern Mythology), a demon in Middle Eastern mythology.
 Divisi or div., a music term used in orchestral scores
 Div, a character in the Penny Arcade
 Divorce, a process in which a married couple breaks up and their marriage license is nullified.

See also
 DIV Games Studio, software for a game development programming language developed by Hammer Technologies; see Fenix Project
 Master of Divinity (M.Div.), a professional and academic degree
 Division (disambiguation)
 Divide (disambiguation)
 Divine (disambiguation)
 Divinity (disambiguation)
 D4 (disambiguation), or D.IV